Qianhuang is a town in Quangang District, Quanzhou, Fujian, China. , it has 13 villages under its administration.

References

Township-level divisions of Fujian
Quanzhou